More Than a Maid is a 2015 South Korean television series starring Jeong Yu-mi, Oh Ji-ho, Kim Dong-wook, Lee Si-a, Jeon So-min and Lee Yi-kyung. It aired on jTBC from January 23 to March 28, 2015 on Fridays and Saturdays at 21:45 (KST) time slot for 20 episodes.

Synopsis
Guk In-yeob (Jeong Yu-mi) is the only daughter of a Joseon nobleman, and her beauty and style has her surrounded by plentiful admirers, among them Kim Eun-gi (Kim Dong-wook), a young scholar from an important family who's loved In-yeob since they were young. But one day In-yeob's father is branded a traitor, causing her family to be forced into ruin, and overnight the city's most popular young lady becomes a slave. In-yeob has difficulty adjusting from her pampered past to her present life as the lowly maid to her former rival. She learns to survive by her wits and befriends her fellow slaves, including Moo-myung (meaning "nameless"), a mysterious manservant who once saved her when she was still an aristocrat. Although Eun-gi remains devoted to In-yeob, her changed social status becomes an obstacle to his promising future, and meanwhile, she begins to fall for the stoic, level-headed but charismatic Moo-myung (Oh Ji-ho), who unbeknownst to all is a warrior on an undercover assignment regarding matters of political import.

Cast

Main
 Jeong Yu-mi as Guk In-yeob, daughter of State Councilor
 Oh Ji-ho as Moo-myung / Lee Bi, head servant of Defense Minister's household
 Kim Dong-wook as Kim Eun-gi, son of Finance Minister
 Lee Si-a as Heo Yoon-ok, daughter of Defense Minister

State Councilor's household
 Jeon No-min as Gook Yoo, Gook In-yeob's father
 Lee Cho-hee as Sawol-yi, Gook In-jeob's personal maid
 Im Hyun-sung as Poong-yi, servant
 Ji Seung-hyun as Duk-goo, Gook Yoo's personal servant

Defense Minister's household
 Park Chul-min as Heo Eung-cham, Defense Minister, Heo Yoon-ok's father 
 Jeon Mi-seon as Lady Yoon, Heo Yoon-ok's mother
 Lee Yi-kyung as Heo Yoon-seo, Heo Yoon-ok's brother
 Lee El as Lady Kang, Heo Yoon-seo's wife
 Chae Gook-hee as Hae-sang, head maid
 Lee Yeon-kyung as Dan-ji's mother, maid
 Jeon So-min as Dan-ji, maid, Heo Yoon-seo's lover
 Jeon Soo-jin as Gaeddong-yi, Heo Yoon-ok's personal maid
 Kim Jong-hoon as Ddeok-soe, butcher
 Shim Hoon-ki as Yong-joon, servant
 Kim Hye-na as Ok-yi, maid

Finance Minister's household
 Kim Kap-soo as Kim Chi-kwon, Finance Minister, Kim Eun-gi's father
 Jin Hee-kyung as Lady Han, Kim Eun-gi's mother
 Yang Seung-pil as Ba-woo, servant

Others
 Ahn Nae-sang as Lee Bang-won, later King Taejong
 Lee Do-kyung as Lee Sung-gye, later King Taejo
 Lee Chae-young as Ga Hee-ah, kisaeng
 Uhm Tae-goo as Chi-bok, Man Wol warrior
 Oh Hee-joon as Hui-ju

Production
The first episode originally aired on December 12, 2014, but a fire on December 13 destroyed the More Than a Maid set in Yeoncheon County and resulted in the death of one crew member, script coordinator Yeom Hye-sun. In the aftermath, the series went on hiatus for six weeks.

A new set was constructed in Yeongjongdo, and filming resumed on January 12, 2015. A re-edited version of the first episode aired on January 23, 2015.

Ratings
 In this table,  represent the lowest ratings and  represent the highest ratings.
 N/A denotes that the rating is not known.

Awards and nominations

International broadcast

References

External links
  
 

2014 South Korean television series debuts
2015 South Korean television series endings
JTBC television dramas
South Korean historical television series
Television series by Drama House